Evergreen Burial Park is a cemetery located at 1307 Summit Avenue, SW in the Raleigh Court neighborhood of Roanoke, Virginia. The cemetery began in 1916 in what was then Roanoke County.

The cemetery was designed by the Hare and Hare design firm of Kansas City, Missouri. There were nearly 25,000 burials in the  cemetery by late 2011. A walking tour is available highlighting some of the more interesting individuals and stories of the social history of Roanoke.

References

External links
 
 Evergreen Burial Park Tombstone Photographs at the Virginia USGenWeb Archives

Cemeteries in Roanoke, Virginia
Roanoke, Virginia